Jordan–Pakistan relations are the bilateral relations embedded between the Islamic Republic of Pakistan and the Hashemite Kingdom of Jordan. Pakistan maintains an embassy in Amman whilst Jordan has an embassy in Islamabad.

History
Pakistan-Jordan contacts began in the 1970s and 1980s, growing stronger since the mid-1990s. In 2001, Pakistani leaders visited Amman to discuss full-scale cooperation. The King of Jordan lauded what he called "deep, strong and historical relations" between the two countries and affirmed Jordan's keenness on consolidating its ties with Pakistan for the benefit of the two peoples.

On November 2, 2007, King Abdullah II of Jordan visited Islamabad and held a formal meeting with the incumbent President of Pakistan, General Pervez Musharraf at the Aiwan-e-Sadr.

In the meeting, Musharraf and Abdullah exchanged views on the overall evolution of regional and international situations, particularly in the Middle East. Concerns over the situation in Iraq were also pointed out, including the emerging sectarian and ethnic divides, and frequent incidents of sacrilegious attacks on holy sites.

Musharraf also spoke to King Abdullah about "Pakistan’s efforts to promote peace and stability in South Asia" and for "addressing the challenges of extremism and terrorism." The two leaders expressed satisfaction over the development of the Pakistani-Jordanian bilateral relations in various fields, especially of the cooperation levels that had successfully been established in the economic and trade segments.

Cultural and geo-political
Pakistan and Jordan are both Muslim countries by majority and belong to the Organisation of Islamic Cooperation (OIC).

Trade and investment
As of 2004 and 2005, the trade volume between Pakistan and Jordan remained at $53.837 million, in which Pakistan's exports stood at $21.013 million and imports were registered at $32.806 million. In the past, many Jordanian leaders have invited Pakistani investors to look into opportunities available in the energy and power sectors of Jordan. In June 2006, an initiation for the process of negotiations in concluding Free Trade Agreement and Protection and Promotion of Investments was scheduled and set during the 8th session of the Pak-Jordan Joint Ministerial Commission. During the session, discussions were also made on matters regarding the overall amount of cooperation in agriculture, science and technology as well as other areas.

See also
 Pakistanis in Jordan
 Princess Sarvath El Hassan

References

External links
Embassy of Pakistan - Amman

 
Bilateral relations of Pakistan
Pakistan